Zachary Whitmarsh (born April 5, 1977 in Victoria, British Columbia) is a track and field athlete from Canada, who competes in the middle distance events. He represented his native country at the 2000 Summer Olympics, finishing in 39th place in the men's 800 metres. He won the bronze medal in the men's 800 metres at the 1999 Pan American Games in Winnipeg.

Competition record

External links 
 

1977 births
Living people
Athletes (track and field) at the 1999 Pan American Games
Athletes (track and field) at the 2000 Summer Olympics
Canadian male middle-distance runners
Olympic track and field athletes of Canada
Pan American Games bronze medalists for Canada
Pan American Games medalists in athletics (track and field)
Athletes from Victoria, British Columbia
Medalists at the 1999 Pan American Games
Athletes (track and field) at the 2002 Commonwealth Games
Commonwealth Games competitors for Canada